Ruggero Ubertalli (15 March 1877 – 7 September 1973) was an Italian equestrian. Born in Biella, Italy, he competed in the individual jumping event at the 1920 Summer Olympics.

References

External links
 

1877 births
1973 deaths
Italian male equestrians
Olympic equestrians of Italy
Equestrians at the 1920 Summer Olympics
People from Biella
Sportspeople from the Province of Biella